The Roselend Dam is an arch-buttress dam located  east of Beaufort in the Savoie department of the Rhône-Alpes region in south-eastern France. It is located just west and below the Cormet de Roselend mountain pass. The dam was designed by Coyne et Bellier and construction began in 1955. The reservoir began to fill in 1960, the power station was operational in 1961 and the dam complete in 1962. It was constructed for the primary purpose of hydroelectric power generation and supports the 546 MW La Bâthie Power Station.

Design and operation
Directly over the river bed is the dam's concrete arch with a  radius. Flanking it on either side are concrete buttresses supporting the dam wall. At the power station, the water feeds six 91 MW Pelton turbine-generators.

See also 

 Renewable energy in France

References

 

Dams in France
Hydroelectric power stations in France
Buttress dams
Buildings and structures in Savoie
Dams completed in 1962
Energy infrastructure completed in 1962
1962 establishments in France
Savoie
Underground power stations
20th-century architecture in France